, 197 players have represented the Wallaroos. The "first" Wallaroo was Karla Matua, while the most recent Wallaroo is Tania Naden — #197.

List

Notes

External links 
 Classic Wallaroos
 Wallaroos Official Website

 
Lists of Australian sportspeople
Lists of Australian sportswomen